is a junction railway station in the city of Toyota, Aichi, Japan, operated by Meitetsu.

Lines
Toyotashi Station is served by the Meitetsu Mikawa Line and is 15.7 kilometers from the terminus of the line at Chiryū Station. It is also served by trains of the Meitetsu Toyota Line which continue past the nominal terminus of the line at Umetsubo Station to terminate at this station.

Station layout
The station has one side platform and one island platform. The station has automated ticket machines, Manaca automated turnstiles and is staffed.

Platforms

Adjacent stations

|-
!colspan=5|Nagoya Railroad

Station history
The Mikawa Railway was merged with Meitetsu on June 1, 1941. The station was renamed to its present name on October 1, 1959. The station building was rebuilt in 1961. The tracks were elevated in 1985 and a new station building was completed at that time.

Passenger statistics
In fiscal 2017, the station was used by an average of 35,081 passengers daily.

Surrounding area
 Toyota City Hall
 Toyota Municipal Museum of Art

See also
 List of Railway Stations in Japan

References

External links

 Official web page 

Railway stations in Japan opened in 1920
Railway stations in Aichi Prefecture
Stations of Nagoya Railroad
Toyota, Aichi